Attiya Inayatullah is a Pakistani politician who had been a member of the National Assembly of Pakistan between 1985 and 2013.

Early life and education
She holds master's degree in Sociology from Boston University and obtained her PhD degree from University of the Punjab.

Political career
Inayatullah served as an adviser on Population Welfare to President of Pakistan Muhammad Zia-ul-Haq in the early 1980s.

She was elected to the National Assembly of Pakistan on reserved seat for women from Punjab in 1985 Pakistani general election and served as a Minister of State for Population Welfare in the federal cabinet of Prime Minister Muhammad Khan Junejo.

She was re-elected to the National Assembly of Pakistan on reserved seat for women from Punjab in 1988 Pakistani general election.

Following the 1999 Pakistani coup d'état by Pervez Musharraf, she served as a member of the National Security Council of Pakistan.

She was re-elected to the National Assembly of Pakistan as a candidate of Pakistan Muslim League (Q) on a seat reserved for women from Punjab in the 2002 Pakistani general election.

She was re-elected to the National Assembly of Pakistan as a candidate of Pakistan Muslim League (Q) on a seat reserved for women from Punjab in the 2008 Pakistani general election.

References

Year of birth missing (living people)
Living people
Pakistan Muslim League (Q) MNAs
Women members of the National Assembly of Pakistan
Pakistani MNAs 1985–1988
Pakistani MNAs 1988–1990
Pakistani MNAs 2002–2007
Pakistani MNAs 2008–2013
Boston University College of Arts and Sciences alumni
University of the Punjab alumni
21st-century Pakistani women politicians